The following world and championship records swum at the 2010 Short Course Worlds, which were held December 15–19, 2010 in Dubai, United Arab Emirates.

World records

Championship Records

It is also possible for the swimmers in the first leg of the relays to break records. In the final of the women's 4×200 metre freestyle relay, Camille Muffat of France broke the championship record in the 200 metre freestyle. In the men's 4×100 metre medley relay, Russian swimmer Stanislav Donets broke the championship record in the 100 metre backstroke. Split times for swimmers not swimming the first leg are ineligible because the incoming swimmer can lean over in front of the blocks and be diving as the preceding swimmer is coming in, whereas the leadoff swimmer is timed from a stationary start.

References

Daily reports (from FINA)
 Dubai, Day 1: China sets first WR of the year and Spain gets first gold ever. FINA. Retrieved on 2010-12-15.
 Dubai, Day 2: Two more WR and tied match (3-3) between USA and Russia. FINA. Retrieved on 2010-12-16.
 Dubai, Day 3: Lochte imperial sets WR in the 200m IM. FINA. Retrieved on 2010-12-17.
 Dubai, Day 4: Belmonte Garcia (ESP), a new Star is born. FINA. Retrieved on 2010-12-18.
 Dubai, Day 5: Lochte (USA), first ever with 7 medals in one championships. FINA. Retrieved on 2010-12-19.

2010 FINA World Swimming Championships (25 m)